Kyle Nipper (born 25 November 1987) is a South African first-class cricketer. He was included in the KZN Inland squad for the 2015 Africa T20 Cup. In August 2017, he was named in Pretoria Mavericks' squad for the first season of the T20 Global League. However, in October 2017, Cricket South Africa initially postponed the tournament until November 2018, with it being cancelled soon after.

In September 2018, he was named in KwaZulu-Natal Inland's squad for the 2018 Africa T20 Cup. He was the leading run-scorer for KwaZulu-Natal Inland in the tournament, with 189 runs in four matches.

References

External links
 

1987 births
Living people
South African cricketers
KwaZulu-Natal Inland cricketers
Cricketers from Pietermaritzburg